Felix Konstandeliasz (born 26 March 1999) is a Swedish footballer. He is currently playing as a midfielder for Lunds BK.

Career statistics
As of 27 May 2018.

References

External links
 Malmö FF profile  
 

1999 births
Living people
Swedish footballers
Sweden youth international footballers
Footballers from Skåne County
Malmö FF players
Mjällby AIF players
Allsvenskan players
Association football midfielders